Once Is Never is a 1955 East German comedy film directed by Konrad Wolf and starring Horst Drinda, Brigitte Krause and Paul Schulz-Wernburg. It was made by the state-controlled studio DEFA.

Cast
 Horst Drinda as Peter Weselin
 Brigitte Krause as Anna Hunzele
 Paul Schulz-Wernburg as Edeltanne
 Annemone Haase as Elvira
 Christoph Engel as Erwin
 Friedrich Gnaß as Hunzele
 Georg Niemann as Düdelit-Düdelat
 Lotte Loebinger as Muhme
 Hilmar Thate as Buhlemann
 Fritz Decho as Fibrament
 Horst Gentzen as Gack
 Edgar Engelmann as Gwriz
 Erich Brauer as Kranz
 Johanna Bucher as Frau Kranz
 Johannes Siegert as Dr. Scherb
 Inge Huber as Marie Alvert
 Johannes Arpe as Arzt
 Gertrud Paulun as Haushälterin
 Norbert Christian as Pinco
 Gustav Müller as Wadenwärmer
 Liska Merbach as Luise
 Paul Pfingst as Fahrer
 Jutta Beetz as Rothaarige Dame
 Maika Joseph as 1. Beerenfrau
 Lotte Meyer as 2. Beerenfrau
 Rolf Bartholsen as Briefträger
 :de:Jutta Zoff as Akkordeonsolistin

References

Bibliography 
 Davidson, John & Hake, Sabine. Framing the Fifties: Cinema in a Divided Germany. Berghahn Books, 2007.

External links 
 

1955 films
1955 comedy films
German comedy films
East German films
1950s German-language films
Films directed by Konrad Wolf
1950s German films